Hennadiy Perepadenko (born 16 June 1964) is a Ukrainian former professional footballer who played for Ukrainian clubs Metalurh Zaporizhya and Chornomorets Odessa, for Russian club Spartak Moscow, for Israeli club Tzafririm Holon and for Spanish club CD Badajoz. At international level, he made three appearances for the USSR national team.

Career
A native of Zaporizhia, Perepadenko played professional football until the age of 31. His most notable successes were with Soviet Top League side Spartak Moscow, where he helped the club reach the semi-finals of the 1990–91 European Cup.

Perepadenko began playing football with local side FC Metalurh Zaporizhya before playing for SKA Odessa while serving in the Soviet military. After he completed military service, Perepadenko joined Soviet Top League side Chornomorets Odessa. Spartak Moscow manager Oleg Romantsev signed Perepadenko in 1990, and the winger helped the club finish second in the last Soviet Top League championship and win the first Russian championship. Perepadenko was named to the list of the top 33 Soviet footballers in 1991.

Late in his career, Perepadenko moved to Spain where he joined Segunda División side CD Badajoz. He initially struggled to fit in, and was fined by manager Marco Antonio Boroñat for showing up late to training. Perepadenko made 81 competitive appearances and scored nine goals for Badajoz, including a hat-trick against Real Burgos CF during the 1993–94 Segunda División season.

His younger brother Serhiy Perepadenko also played football professionally.

After he retired from playing, Perepadenko moved to Barcelona where he started a business with his brother. In 2003, he joined former footballer Igor Belanov in investing in troubled Swiss side FC Wil.

References

External links
 
 

1964 births
Living people
Footballers from Zaporizhzhia
Ukrainian footballers
Soviet footballers
Association football midfielders
Soviet Union international footballers
Soviet Top League players
Russian Premier League players
Israeli Premier League players
Segunda División players
FC Metalurh Zaporizhzhia players
FC Chornomorets Odesa players
FC Spartak Moscow players
Hapoel Tzafririm Holon F.C. players
CD Badajoz players
Ukrainian expatriate footballers
Ukrainian expatriate sportspeople in Spain
Expatriate footballers in Spain
Ukrainian expatriate sportspeople in Israel
Expatriate footballers in Israel
Ukrainian expatriate sportspeople in Russia
Expatriate footballers in Russia